Bangana devdevi is a species of cyprinid fish found in India, Myanmar, and Thailand.

References

Bangana
Fish described in 1936
Taxa named by Sunder Lal Hora